Amélie Boudet (23 November 1795 – 21 January 1883) was a French teacher and artist, and wife of Allan Kardec, the founder of Spiritism. After his death, she became the world's leading authority on Spiritism.

Early life
She was the only daughter of Julien Louis Boudet, notary, and Julie-Louise Seigneat of Lacombe, teacher. Growing up, she was known by the nickname "Gaby."

Marriage
On February 9, 1832, she married Allan Kardec.

Career
According to the biographer Henri Sausse, she was a first-class teacher who founded the first Escola Normal Leiga with the guidance of Johann Heinrich Pestalozzi on Boulevard Saint-Germain in Paris, where she lived all her life.

She graduated from the École Normale and became a primary school teacher, and later a professor of literature and of the fine arts. She is the author of three books: Fabulae Primaveris (1825), Notions de Dessin (1826), and L'Essentiel dans les Beaux-arts (1828).

She was also a poet and artist, and was said to have a mastery of traditional techniques.

Role in the creation of Spiritism
Beginning in 1856, Amélie Boudet aided her husband in codifying Spiritism, served as his secretary, and gave him advice, of which he took great account. When Allan Kardec was asked to found the Revue Spirite, the spiritualist bookshop and local Parisian Society of Spiritist Studies, it was Boudet who encouraged him to devote himself to this publication despite many detractors.

After the death of her husband in 1869, Boudet assumed all the necessary responsibilities for the management of Spiritism in France and the world. She assumed the management of the Revue Spirite and its publications, gaining rights to the spiritualist works of Kardec.

Death

Boudet died in her Paris home on 21 January 1883 and was buried next to her husband in Père Lachaise Cemetery.

Published works
 Fabulae Primaveris (1825)
 Notions de Dessin (1826)
 L'Essentiel dans les Beaux-arts (1828)

Honours
In 2004, a Parisian spiritual center of Spiritism, L'Institut Amélie Boudet, was named after her.

References

Bibliography
 Souto Maior, Marcel. Kardec - A Biografia (1ª edição). São Paulo: Ed. Record, 2013.
 Wantuil, Zêus, and Francisco Thiesen. Allan Kardec, Meticulosa Pesquisa Biobibliográfica. Vol. 3. Rio, RJ, Brasil: Federação Espírita Brasileira, Departamento Editorial, 1979. Print.

External links
 Institut Amélie Boudet website

1795 births
1883 deaths
Spiritism
French educators
French spiritual writers
French women writers
Burials at Père Lachaise Cemetery
French artists
People from Thiais
19th-century French educators
19th-century women writers
19th-century women educators